Gedson Carvalho Fernandes (born 9 January 1999) is a Portuguese professional footballer who plays as a midfielder for Turkish Süper Lig club Beşiktaş. Born in São Tomé and Príncipe, he represents the Portugal national football team.

Club career

Benfica
Born in São Tomé, Fernandes started his career at SC Frielas in Portugal in 2008. A year later, he joined S.L. Benfica's youth system, where he progressed to the club's reserve team in 2017. On 11 February that year, he made his professional debut with Benfica B in a LigaPro 4–2 win over Desportivo das Aves.

Following his promotion to Benfica's first team in the 2018–19 season, Fernandes debuted as a starter in a 1–0 home win over Fenerbahçe in the first leg of the UEFA Champions League third qualifying round on 7 August 2018. A week later, in the second leg away, he scored a 26th-minute opener in a 1–1 draw, which qualified Benfica to the competition's play-off round.

Tottenham Hotspur (loan)
Fernandes signed on an 18-month loan for Premier League club Tottenham Hotspur on 15 January 2020. He made his Premier League debut coming on in the 80th minute away against Watford on 18 January, which ended 0–0.
Fernandes was recalled by Benfica on 1 February 2021.

Galatasaray (loan) 
In January 2021, Fernandes moved to Turkish club Galatasaray, on a loan deal until the end of the season.

Beşiktaş 
On 3 February 2022, Turkish club Beşiktaş announced a deal to purchase Fernandes. Since the club already had met their maximum quota of foreign players, his contract was made to start on 1 July 2022. Until then, Benfica loaned him to fellow Süper Lig club Çaykur Rizespor.

Career statistics

Club

Honours
Benfica Youth
 Campeonato Nacional de Juniores: 2017–18
 UEFA Youth League runner-up: 2016–17

Benfica
 Primeira Liga: 2018–19

Portugal U17
UEFA European Under-17 Championship: 2016

Individual
2016 UEFA European Under-17 Championship Team of the Tournament
Primeira Liga Best Young Player of the Month: August 2018

References

External links

1999 births
Living people
People from São Tomé
Portuguese footballers
Portugal international footballers
Portugal under-21 international footballers
Portugal youth international footballers
São Tomé and Príncipe footballers
São Tomé and Príncipe emigrants to Portugal
Association football midfielders
S.L. Benfica B players
S.L. Benfica footballers
Tottenham Hotspur F.C. players
Liga Portugal 2 players
Primeira Liga players
Premier League players
Black Portuguese sportspeople
Portuguese expatriate footballers
Portuguese expatriate sportspeople in England
São Tomé and Príncipe expatriate footballers
Expatriate footballers in England
Galatasaray S.K. footballers
Beşiktaş J.K. footballers
Çaykur Rizespor footballers
Süper Lig players
Portuguese people of São Tomé and Príncipe descent